Conjuboy is a remote rural locality in the Shire of Etheridge, Queensland, Australia.

Geography 
The Gregory Developmental Road passes through the locality from the south-west to the south-east, while the Kennedy Developmental Road passes through the locality from the east to the south; they intersect in the south of the locality.

The ridge of the Great Dividing Range runs from north to south through Conjuboy creating a watershed. Dry River rises in the east of the locality and flows into the Herbert River and ultimately into the Ross River towards the Coral Sea. Spring Creek rises in the north-west of the locality and flows into the Einasleigh River and ultimately into the Gilbert River into the Gulf of Carpentaria.

The predominant land use is grazing on native vegetation.

History 
The locality was officially named and bounded on 23 June 2000; however the name has been in use as a pastoral station since at least 1934 when it was operated by Arthur Darcy Wilson.

Education 
There are no schools in Conjuboy. The nearest primary schools are Greenvale State School in neighbouring Greenvale to the south-east and Mount Surprise State School in neighbouring Mount Surprise to the north-west. There are no secondary schools near Conjuboy; distance education and boarding schools are the only options.

References 

Shire of Etheridge
Localities in Queensland